The Karary University (Arabic: جامعة كرري) is a university based in the city of Omdurman in the state of Khartoum, Sudan.
The university was established in 1996 as a public university funded by the Ministry of Higher Education and Scientific Research. The Karary Academy of Technology was conceived as tertiary educational institution that would prepare engineering and technological students to meet the needs of the armed forces and military industries, and to guide the relevant scientific research.
In 2011, according to Centro de Ciencias Humanas y Sociales, Madrid, the university ranked 10,494 in the world, fourth in Sudan. In Sudan, it ranked behind the University of Khartoum, Sudan University of Science and Technology, National Ribat University and ahead of the International University of Africa.

References

Universities and colleges in Sudan
Educational institutions established in 1996
1996 establishments in Sudan